Karim Raeisinia (born 1 January 1930 in Tehran) is an Iranian deaf wrestler and a Deaflympics gold medalist. He won four freestyle and Greco-Roman wrestling Deaflympics medals in 62–67 kg category of 1957 Milan and 1961 Helsinki. However, he was unable to gain a medal in the 73–79 kg category of the 1965 Washington DC games because of an injury and was ranked 4th in both Freestyle and Greco-Roman. He was a friend of Abolhassan Ilchi Kabir and Gholamreza Takhti. Mansour Raeisi is also his cousin.

References 

1930 births
Sportspeople from Tehran
Deaf martial artists
Living people
Iranian male sport wrestlers
Iranian deaf people
20th-century Iranian people
21st-century Iranian people